Elisabeth is a 1990 album by Norwegian singer Elisabeth Andreassen. The song "Jag ser en stjärna falla" earned her a seventh-place finish in Melodifestivalen 1990, the Swedish qualifier for the Eurovision Song Contest 1990.

Track listing

Side A
"Varje gång du rör mig"
"Kvinna för dig"
"Nä, nä, nä (Rätt eller fel)"
"Vänskapen består" ("That's why I fell in Love with You")
"Ta mig" ("For True Love")

Side B
"Jag ser en stjärna falla"
"Segla med mig"
"Kortet de' e' lagt"
"Kärlek som din" - ("A Lover Like You") - duet with Tommy Nilsson
"Utan dig"
"Kylig natt" ("Looks Like It's Gonna Rain Today")

Participating musicians
Lasse Jonsson – guitar
Bosse Persson – bass
Lasse Persson – drums
Hans Gardemar – keyboard

References 

1990 albums
Elisabeth Andreassen albums